The Nimbus was a Danish motorcycle produced from 1919 to 1960 by Fisker and Nielsen of Copenhagen, Denmark, also manufacturers of "Nilfisk" brand vacuum cleaners (now Nilfisk). Two basic models were produced, both with a 750 cc four-cylinder engine.

History
In partnership with H.M. Nielsen, Peder Andersen Fisker produced electric motors and, from around 1910, the first vacuum cleaners in Europe. Fisker believed he could develop a motorcycle that had its own form, and in late 1918 decided to construct a prototype to his own design.

"Stovepipe"

The first Nimbus motorcycle had a four-cylinder inline engine of  capacity, which drove the rear wheel through a shaft drive rather than the chain usually used at that time, and a power output of approximately 10 hp. It had both front and rear wheel suspension, and soon acquired the nickname of Kakkelovnsrør ("Stovepipe") due to the thick, round pipe between the saddle and handlebars which as well as forming part of the bike’s chassis contained the petrol tank. Two more machines were constructed in 1919, but mass production did not begin until 'Fisker & Nielsen' became a limited liability company in 1920. 

Disappointed by poor sales, Fisker began entering the Stovepipe in all the races that he could, often with a sidecar attached, and built up a good reputation for the machine. The 'Stovepipe' was technically improved along the way, mainly in details, but also with the two main types of fronts forks, which distinguished the Type A (shown) from the Type B. However, the introduction of a sales tax on motorcycles in 1924 and an economic recession resulted in production being discontinued from 1926 after 1,300 machines had been produced.

Type C

With his son Anders, Fisker started designing a new machine in 1932 and in 1934 they demonstrated a new Nimbus motorcycle, the Type C. It retained the shaft drive, a completely redesigned ohv and ohc engine of 18 (later 22) hp, and a frame made from 40mm X 8mm steel flat bar using riveted construction. The frame was shaped to go around the fuel tank, much like the pressed steel frames on several other motorcycles of the period, e.g. Zündapp. Front suspension was by telescopic fork; although this was introduced a year before the BMW R12, the R12's fork had hydraulic damping upon introduction while the Nimbus's fork did not have hydraulic damping until 1939. Its distinctive humming exhaust note led to it being nicknamed Humlebien ("Bumblebee").

The first customer received his Type C in the summer of 1934 and thanks to an efficient dealer network, the Bumblebee soon became the best-selling motorcycle in Denmark. The Danish Post Office, Army and Police purchased substantial numbers of this model and in 1939 as war loomed, the Danish government spent DKK 50 million on motorising the army and many Type Cs were included in this expenditure.

During the occupation by German forces from 1940 to 1945, it was difficult for Fisker & Nielsen to obtain the materials needed for motorcycle production and only about 600 machines were made during the period.

Shortly after World War II, a much improved ohv engine was built and tested. Seeing, however, that the factory had no trouble selling every motorcycle built, it was decided not to make any major investments in new tooling. Instead more minor improvements were made to the existing models, usually making it possible to upgrade older models. The Danish Army bought around 20% of Fisker & Nielsen's total production, which no doubt influenced the decision not to introduce a new model; the military would be unlikely to want an enlarged spares inventory to support an additional model. 

The Postal Service bought many Type C models, using them as late as 1972. The Danish police force was also a large customer but phased out their Nimbuses much earlier in the late 1950s and early 1960s when they became too slow to keep up with modern cars and motorcycles; the top speed of a stock solo bike was only , and that for brief bursts only. Very few were exported.

In the 1950s some further prototypes were built, like a four-cylinder with a rotary valve and carbon seals as well as a two-cylinder model with sprung rear suspension, neither of which reached production. Several prototypes with sprung rear suspension and an Earles front fork also were built.

Many details of the "″Bumblebee" were changed during its lifespan, major ones being a switch from hand to foot gear change, larger brakes (150mm to 180mm) and an improved front fork (the "High" fork). Still, the basic design was never updated and as interest in motorcycles declined in the late 1950s as a consequence of the availability of cheap cars such as the Volkswagen Beetle, production ceased in 1959, when the last contract from the army was delivered.

The Nimbus now has attained almost iconic status, not only in Denmark but also abroad where its very individual character makes it a machine of unusual technical interest.

Surviving examples
Of around 12,000 "Bumblebees" produced, today more than 4,000 are registered and running in Denmark alone, and likely a few hundreds are used outside Denmark, mainly in Sweden, Germany and the US. Many other Type "C" examples exist, either in museums or otherwise not currently registered for road use.

Even today most spare parts (although not "tinware") are readily available as well as being relatively inexpensive. Thanks to the design's inherent reliability, using a Nimbus on a daily basis is still considered easy and economical. Nevertheless (and with some notable exceptions), today most Nimbus owners rarely ride more than a few thousand kilometers a year. Also, as the Nimbus often came from the factory with a sidecar attached, many of the ones on the road have recently been fitted with such.

In popular culture
In the 1948 short film by the great Danish director Carl Theodor Dreyer, De nåede færgen (They Made it to the Ferry), considered by film enthusiasts as a masterpiece of suspense and rhythm. Though it was formally an educational short flick about road safety, the young couple involved in a race with death (a sinister grim reaper figure driving recklessly an old fashioned hearse-style sort of van) while speeding to catch the Nyborg ferry in time is riding a 1948 Nimbus 750 sports model.

The rider's brag for 120 km/h top speed to a young petrol pump maid may be over-optimistic for this kind of workhorse, specially with a passenger on the pillion seat, but the couple nevertheless finally take the ferry over River Styx...in twin coffins.

References

Sources

External links

The Danish Nimbus Touring (Danish Site)
Motorcycle Classics article on 1952 Nimbus Type C

Veteran vehicles
Vintage vehicles
Motorcycle manufacturers of Denmark